Geschichte des osmanischen Reiches (German: "History of the Ottoman Empire") is a work by the Austrian orientalist historian Joseph von Hammer-Purgstall. It was written in 10 volumes between 1827 and 1835.  The result of 30 years of work, it became the standard reference on the subject.

According to the Turkish historian Doğan Gürpınar, this "monumental" work is "arguably the equivalent of Gibbon's Decline and Fall for Ottoman historiography. It was never translated into English, but was translated into Turkish in 1917.

English historian Sir Edward Creasy used it as his main source for History of the Ottoman Turks (1854).

Editions

First Edition volumes

Second Edition volumes

References

Austrian literature
1835 non-fiction books
History books about the Ottoman Empire
German-language books